During the 1996–97 English football season, Queens Park Rangers competed in the Football League First Division.

Season summary
In August 1996, media tycoon Chris Wright, a QPR fan for 20 years, bought the club and also stated his plans for London Wasps to distribute the stadium.

Wright later suggested forming a new Loftus Road plc, including both QPR and London Wasps, on the Alternative Investment Market. A month later, Ray Wilkins left the club by mutual consent after a board meeting when he wanted money in an attempt to sign 34-year-old Ghana skipper Abedi Pele as well as being pushed to retire from his playing career. Ex-Arsenal caretaker manager Stewart Houston took over the reins with former Arsenal manager Bruce Rioch as his assistant.

Houston's first signing for QPR broke the club's previous transfer record when Scottish international striker John Spencer was signed from Chelsea for £2.35 million in November 1996. A month later, his ex-Chelsea teammate and former QPR player Gavin Peacock rejoined the club for a second spell. Northern Ireland international Steve Morrow also joined from Arsenal.

Ultimately, QPR's poor home form during the season cost them a chance of a play-off place and they finished 9th, five points outside the play-off places.

Final league table

Results
Queens Park Rangers' score comes first

Legend

Football League First Division

FA Cup

League Cup

Players

First-team squad
Squad at end of season

References

Notes

Queens Park Rangers F.C. seasons
Queens Park Rangers